Nosferatu D2 were an indie rock band from Surrey, England. Although their years were short, the band would experience something of a posthumous renaissance on the strength of their shelved debut album being released by the fledgling Audio Antihero label. The album and the story of its release would be the subject of a number of BBC stories, while the album itself has received continued acclaim and airplay long after its release.

2005–2007
Nosferatu D2 formed in the ashes of the similarly short-lived band called Tempertwig who released one single (a 7" split with Air Formation) before splitting up and freeing brothers Ben (Guitar/Vocals) and Adam Parker (drums) to begin again as Nosferatu D2. Tempertwig would however find a fan in the BBC's Steve Lamacq before their split, with Lamacq airing their "Bratpack Film Philosophy" single on his evening show. After Tempertwig, Nosferatu D2 began to play shows and demo new material, some of which was aired on XFM by John Kennedy and BBC Radio 1 by Huw Stephens. One of these demos received a praising review from the NME courtesy of James McMahon and another earned a recommendation from Art Brut member Chris Chinchilla.

Their most notable shows were with Air Formation and an opening slot for Los Campesinos! and Sky Larkin at The Spitz. Los Campesinos! would soon achieve success on the Wichita Records label and would give Nosferatu D2 a "thanks to" credit on their debut "Hold on Now, Youngster..." LP.

Ben Parker would then begin writing and recording under the Superman Revenge Squad name (taken from the comic book organisations of the same name) and Nosferatu D2 would quietly disband.

Despite the sparsity of their catalogue at this time and only having played a handful of shows, their song "Springsteen" caught the attention of Jamie Halliday the future founder of Audio Antihero records. Their enthusiasm for the band would finally materialise in the release of their debut album in October 2009, more than two years since they disbanded.

Debut album/Posthumous acclaim
In October 2009, the fledgling Audio Antihero label announced Nosferatu D2's "We're Gonna Walk Around This City With Our Headphones On To Block Out The Noise" LP as their debut release. This announcement was met by praise from Los Campesinos! member Gareth Campesinos! who said it "fucks up his provisional albums of the year list." The album was distributed by PMD.

The album itself was critically acclaimed. Drowned In Sound gave it 9/10 and called it "some kind of alchemy, not to be repeated", Pitchfork said it was "perfect in its hopelessness", The 405 awarded them 9/10 and speculated that it might be "one of those forgotten albums that will be hailed as influential come five or ten years", This Is Fake DIY graded it 8/10, The Music Fix labeled it a "lo-fi masterpiece" with a 9/10, Music Emissions awarded the LP a perfect 10/10, The Organ simply stated "I do like this, like it lots actually", Scotland's The Skinny marked it as 4/5, and The Line Of Best Fit stated that "your record collection is incomplete without its inclusion."

The album was also well received internationally by radio with songs from the album given multiple airings on BBC 6 Music, Dandelion Radio, NME Radio, ResonanceFM, Florida's WVUM FM, Melbourne's Triple R FM, Kooba Radio, BSM Rocks! Radio, the inaugural God Is In The TV podcast. Jon Solomon's show on New Jersey's WPRB FM, Vancouver's CITR-FM and The Wrong Rock Show on South Africa's Bush Radio.

The album and its story has endured and several radio features have been dedicated to it. In January 2011 Tom Robinson interviewed Ben Parker and Jamie Halliday about the album on a special "I Need An Antihero" edition of BBC Introducing, in September 2010 Spark Radio named the disbanded Nosferatu D2 as their "Artist Of The Month" and interviewed Audio Antihero about the release, in August 2011 Miami's WVUMFM featured an hour long Audio Antihero special in which Nosferatu D2 were a main topic, and in August 2012 BBC World Service/PRI's "The World" aired a feature story on the Nosferatu D2 album which included music from the band and interviews with the artist and label.

In September 2012 the band would re-issue remastered recordings of their final show as "Nosferatu D2 – Live At The Spitz" on the Audio Antihero label. It was made available as a free download via Bandcamp and like their debut album found acclaim from the online press.

Though the band have not recorded since their split and have stated that they will not reform they have contributed unreleased recordings to charity compilations to raise money for FSID, Shelterbox, Save The Children, Red Cross, Japan Society and New York (following Hurricane Sandy).

The band were remembered again in a "Buried Treasures" article for the Faded Glamour culture site and in a "Lost Bands" story dedicated to the band in a paperback book published by Rhubarb Bomb. Label-mate Benjamin Shaw would also cover their Anti-Christmas song "It's Christmas Time (For God's Sake)," the song was used once more for Darren Hayman (Hefner/The French) and FIKA Recordings' 2011 Digital Advent Calendar where they were featured alongside fellow AAH artists including Jack Hayter, Fighting Kites, Paul Hawkins, Ian Button, Broken Shoulder and Benjamin Shaw.

In 2015, the album was reissued on cassette by Audio Antihero alongside a pay-what-you-want EP of non-album recordings entitled "Older, Wiser, Sadder" – which praised by Drowned in Sound.

Other projects from the Parker brothers
Pre-Nosferatu D2, Ben and Adam Parker performed bassist Daniel Debono under the name Tempertwig between 1999 and 2004. They released a split single with Air Formation and a number of independent demos. Their music was praised at the time by Drowned in Sound and Steve Lamacq. In 2019, the majority of their recorded material was compiled under the name "FAKE NOSTALGIA: An Anthology of Broken Stuff" by Audio Antihero Records and Randy Sadage Records for a 29 March release.

Post-Nosferatu D2, Ben and Adam Parker reunited with a number of other musicians for the "There is Nothing More Frightening Than the Passing of Time" album by The Superman Revenge Squad Band, an expanded version of Ben Parker's Superman Revenge Squad solo project. The album received positive reviews  and support from BBC 6 Music.

Discography

Albums and EPs
We're Gonna Walk Around This City With Our Headphones On to Block Out the Noise (Audio Antihero, 2009)
Older, Wiser, Sadder – EP (Audio Antihero, 2015)

Live albums
Live at the Spitz (05/03/2007) (Audio Antihero/BarelyOut Recordings, 2012)

Compilation appearances
Bob Hope Would – for Japan (Audio Antihero, 2011) – contributes "The Kids From FAME" / "Older, Wiser, Sadder" / "A Man at War With Himself"
Some.Alternate.Universe – for FSID (Audio Antihero, 2012) – contributes "A Footnote" (Demo)
Audio Antihero's Commercial Suicide Sampler (Audio Antihero, 2012) – contributes "Springsteen"
The Hüsker Doo-wop EP for New York (Audio Antihero/Hear It For NY, 2012) – contributes "Older, Wiser, Sadder"
Into the Light: Volume Three for Pussy Riot (Unwashed Territories, 2012) – contributes "It's Christmas Time (For God's Sake)"
Elder Statesman: Nine Long Years of Audio Antihero Records (Audio Antihero, 2019) – contributes "Springsteen"

References

English indie rock groups